Jeff Hoad (born January 26, 1973) is a Canadian-British former professional ice hockey player.  He played in the British Ice Hockey Superleague for the Nottingham Panthers, Ayr Scottish Eagles, London Knights and the Belfast Giants. He also played in the East Coast Hockey League for the Erie Panthers and Toledo Storm, the American Hockey League for the Springfield Falcons and the German 2nd Bundesliga for the EC Bad Tölz.  He played for the Great Britain national ice hockey team in three World Championships. He is now a member of the Brandon, Manitoba Police Service.

Career statistics

External links

1971 births
Living people
Ayr Scottish Eagles players
Belfast Giants players
Brandon Wheat Kings players
British ice hockey centres
Canadian ice hockey centres
Erie Panthers players
EC Bad Tölz players
Ice hockey people from Manitoba
Moose Jaw Warriors players
London Knights (UK) players
Nottingham Panthers players
Sportspeople from Brandon, Manitoba
Springfield Falcons players
Tri-City Americans players
Toledo Storm players
Canadian expatriate ice hockey players in England
Canadian expatriate ice hockey players in Scotland
Canadian expatriate ice hockey players in Germany
Canadian expatriate ice hockey players in Northern Ireland
Canadian expatriate ice hockey players in the United States
Naturalised citizens of the United Kingdom
Naturalised sports competitors
British expatriate ice hockey people
British expatriate sportspeople in Germany